Myanmar Now is a news agency based in Myanmar (Burma). Myanmar Now journalists publish bilingual Burmese and English articles on an eponymous online news portal. The agency provides free syndication throughout the country, with a distribution network of over 50 national and local media outlets that regularly republish its stories. As of September 2019, Myanmar Now had a readership of over 350,000, and a team of 30 journalists. The news service is noted for its in-depth reporting on high-impact issues, including corruption, child labor, human rights, and social justice.

History

Myanmar Now was established by the Thomson Reuters Foundation in 2015 to support in-depth independent journalism, in the lead-up to the 2015 Myanmar general election. The news service officially launched in August of that year. The agency is led by Swe Win, its chief correspondent and editor-in-chief. Its founding chief correspondent was Thin Lei Win, a Reuters journalist. Since the inception of the news service, several Myanmar Now journalists, including Swe Win, have been threatened and assaulted by military and legal authorities for their work.

On 8 March 2021, soldiers of the Myanmar military junta raided the headquarters Myanmar Now, before they announced to ban five media outlets amidst the ongoing protests.

Recognition 
In 2016, Htet Khaung Lin, a Myanmar Now journalist, was awarded the European Commission's Lorenzo Natali Media Prize, for a piece on underage sex workers in Myanmar.

That same year, it received an honorable mention in the Society of Publishers in Asia Awards for investigative reporting, namely a piece on the 969 Movement.

In 2019, Swe Win won the Ramon Magsaysay Award for Emergent Leadership, for his leadership in fostering journalistic integrity and quality in Myanmar as Myanmar Now's editor-in-chief.

In a group with other collaborating news organizations, Myanmar Now was awarded an Online Journalism Award for "2020 Excellence in Collaboration and Partnerships", specifically for reporting on pangolins.

See also
Myanmar Times
Frontier Myanmar
The Irrawaddy

References

External links
 

Burmese news websites
News agencies based in Myanmar
2015 establishments in Myanmar
Mass media in Yangon